Anastasios (Tasos) Giannopoulos (1931 – November 8, 1977) was a Greek actor.  He was born in 1931 and died of cancer on November 8, 1977 at the age of 46.  He was famous as Kitsos in his movies.

Filmography

External links

1931 births
1977 deaths
Deaths from cancer in Greece
20th-century Greek male actors